Santa Margerita Chapel (English: Saint Margaret Chapel), also known as Arar Chapel, is a 16th century chapel in San Gwann, Malta. The chapel was built for the farmers working the surrounding fields. At the time, attacks from the sea were common. 

The chapel was partially damaged during World War II, with serious damage but large portions surviving. Today the church is a landmark in San Gwann, in architectural contrast with the modern housing of the area.

History
The exact date when Saint Margerita Chapel was built is unknown but it was around the event of the Great Siege of Malta. It was mentioned for the first time in an inscription of Monsignor Pietro Dusina in 1575, when he was sent by the papacy to inspect the sparse chapels on the Maltese islands. He found the chapel to be the property of a local man named Salvu Calleja who made sure that a Mass took place in the chapel once a year on the feast day of St. Margaret. However, according to the standards of an inspecting Monsignor, it was not suitable to be a place of worship, as it was not well kept and had no door. He ordered that the chapel not be used until a door was attached to the entrance.

In the inscription it is written:

Saint Margaret Chapel was deconsecrated in 1605, since in the late 16th century and in the early 17th century attacks by the Ottoman Empire increased and the chapel fell into disuse. It was consecrated again in 1618 by Bishop Baldassare Cagliares. Bishop Michele Girolamo Molina in 1658 observed that it suffered serious neglect while abandoned, and Father Giacomo Pullucino took the initiative to restore the chapel, finishing in 1666. Pullicino died in 1680 and was allowed to be buried inside the chapel, as documented by Bishop Miguel Juan Balaguer Camarasa, the parish priest of Birkirkara. At the time San Gwann was a part of Birkirkara and consequentially San Gwann was originally part of Birkirkara parish, and ecclesiastical decisions were taken there. Following the death of Pullucino his family was also given permission to be interned in the chapel when they died. In 1680 Bishop Molina made a courtesy visit and offered Mass, as did Bishop Joaquín Canaves In 1718.

Recent

During World War II several families relocated to San Gwann from the Valletta and the surrounding cities and suburbs, for safety's sake. The chapel was directly hit during the war, destroying its ceiling and one of the side walls. After the war more families relocated to San Gwann as many of buildings in the cities had suffered serious damage. The chapel's damaged parts and original architecture were restored. 

On the inauguration plaque it is written:

A parish church dedicated to Our Lady of Lourdes was built in the 1950s, replacing the chapel. Today the chapel is used for adoration, with Masses celebrated less frequently. It is sometimes used for the children of the local schools, for weddings and on the feast of Saint Margaret. Traditionally the chapel was in the middle of farming fields and agricultural lands, but today it is in the middle of an urban zone. The chapel's building is used as a roundabout and stands proudly as a landmark on its own. In 1994 it was scheduled as a grade 1 national monument by the Malta Environment and Planning Authority. In 2003 a new monument by the name of Kolonna Eterna was installed just in front of the chapel. The two monuments are in contrast, but complement each other in this central area of San Gwann.

Cultural Heritage
Santa Margerita Chapel is scheduled as a grade 1 national monument since 1994 by the Malta Environment and Planning Authority (MEPA).

References

16th-century Roman Catholic church buildings in Malta
Architecture in Malta
San Ġwann
Limestone churches in Malta
Roman Catholic chapels in Malta
Roundabouts and traffic circles in Malta